Dr. István György (born October 31, 1959) is a Hungarian jurist and politician, who served as Mayor of Kőbánya (10th district of Budapest) between 1990 and 2002. He was Deputy Mayor of Budapest responsible for the urban management from 2010 to 2014. György was appointed Director of the Budapest Government Office on July 1, 2014, replacing Imre Pesti. He served in this capacity until January 2020, when he was appointed Secretary of State for Public Services. He was replaced as director by fellow Fidesz politician Botond Sára.

György also represented Kőbánya (Budapest Constituency XIV) in the National Assembly of Hungary between 2010 and 2014. He was a member of the Constitutional, Judicial and Standing Orders Committee from May 14, 2010 to November 2, 2010. After that he worked in the Economic and Information Technology Committee.

References

1959 births
Living people
Hungarian jurists
Fidesz politicians
Members of the National Assembly of Hungary (2010–2014)
Mayors of places in Hungary
Politicians from Budapest